Beväpna dig med tanken is a Freda' studio album released on 21 November 2014.

Track listing
Beväpna dig med tanken
Kärleken bär
Före tystnaden
Följer stegen bakåt
Ta det som det är
Vägen till ett hjärta
Det vi ger
Vi bär på samma dröm
Genom nätterna
Lämnade allt för vintern

Charts

References

2014 albums
Freda' albums
Swedish-language albums